The men's singles competition of the table tennis events at the 2021 Southeast Asian Games was held from 18 to 20 May at the Hải Dương Gymnasium, Hải Dương, Vietnam.

Schedule
All times are Vietnam Time (UTC+07:00).

Results

Preliminary round

Group 1

Group 2

Group 3

Group 4

Knockout round

Semifinals

Gold Medal Match

References

External links
 

Men's singles